Miami Lyric Opera (MLO) is an opera company in Miami-Dade County, Florida, United States. The company was founded by the Italian tenor Raffaele Cardone, establishing itself as a non-profit organization in 2004. It attempted to take advantage of a small niche market for opera in the region.

After having an inaugural concert of arias in October 2004, the company "presented its first fully staged production" in April 2005, with a performance of La traviata by Giuseppe Verdi. This was followed by an August performance of Cavalleria Rusticana by Pietro Mascagni.

Performances of the company are held at the Olympia Theater at the Gusman Center for the Performing Arts. The theater also applies grant funds towards underwriting the performances of the opera company.

References

External links
 

American opera companies
Musical groups established in 2004
Performing arts in Florida
2004 establishments in Florida